Montrose is a surname. Notable people with the surname include:

 Lewis Montrose (born 1988), English footballer
 Louis Montrose (born 1950), American literary theorist and academic scholar
 Ronnie Montrose (1947–2012), American guitarist

See also
Duke of Montrose
 James Graham, 1st Marquess of Montrose (commonly called "the great Montrose")
 James Graham, 2nd Marquess of Montrose